Aji Bayu Putra (born 11 May 1993) is an Indonesian professional footballer who plays as a goalkeeper for Liga 2 club Gresik United.

Club career

PSIS Semarang 
After enroll the Trial, January 20, 2017. Aji signed a contract with PSIS Semarang.

Persiraja Banda Aceh
The newly promoted club, Persiraja Banda Aceh, confirmed that Aji Bayu will play for them to compete in 2020 Liga 1. This season was suspended on 27 March 2020 due to the COVID-19 pandemic. The season was abandoned and was declared void on 20 January 2021.

PSM Makassar
Aji Bayu was signed for PSM Makassar to play in Liga 1 in the 2022–23 season.

References

External links
 Aji Bayu Putra at Soccerway
 Aji Bayu Putra at Liga Indonesia

1993 births
Indonesian footballers
Living people
PSIM Yogyakarta players
PSIS Semarang players
Badak Lampung F.C. players
Association football goalkeepers
People from Brebes Regency
Sportspeople from Central Java